Horizon Datacom Solutions, Inc. is an aftermarket network equipment reseller and I.T. consulting and technical services firm located in Columbus, Ohio.  Horizon Datacom is a Women’s Business Enterprise National Council (WBENC) certified and has an A+ rating with the Better Business Bureau.

Established in 1995 to provide pre-owned data communications equipment to information specialists worldwide, Horizon Datacom was recognized in 2003 as one of the Inc. 500 fastest growing companies in the U.S 

"Horizon Datacom provides two primary services: purchasing excess network hardware from customers who want to sell and providing refurbished gear for those who want to buy."

Primarily focusing on Cisco, PowerConnect, Procurve, Foundry Networks, Force10, Extreme Networks, and Brocade Communications Systems manufactured network hardware; Horizon Datacom has no restrictions on brands it will buy and sell.  With this business model, Horizon Datacom reached one million dollars in inventory on May 18, 2007.

Awards
Owner, Vicky Nosbisch, was featured in the WELD (Women for Economic and Leadership Development) “12 Women You Should Know” 2005 Calendar and was highlighted in the May, 2009, article "Biz Ladies", in Columbus CEO magazine.

Winner: Columbus Business First, Healthiest Employer, small company category, 2013
TopCAT Green Innovation Award nominee, 2008
Top Diversity Owned Business, 2005
Top 500 Women Owned Business, 2004
TopCAT, Outstanding Women In Technology, 2003, recipient Vicky Nosbisch

References

External links
Official Website
Official Twitter Account
Official Blog Account
Official Facebook Account

Companies based in Ohio